Wedding Painter is the conventional name for an ancient Greek vase painter active in Athens from circa 480 to 460 BC. He painted in the red-figure technique. His name vase is a pyxis in the Louvre depicting the wedding of Thetis and Peleus.

Works

Athens, National Archaeological Museum
krater 1388 • pyxis 14908
Barcelona, Museo Arqueologico
fragment of a bowl 584 • fragment of a bowl stand 4339
Berkeley, University of California, Robert H. Lowie Museum
bowl 924 A
Berlin, Antikensammlung
lip cup F 2547
Bologna, Museo Civico Archeologico
fragment of a bowl 373 • bowl 374
Bonn, Akademisches Kunstmuseum
bowl 144 A
Boston, Museum of Fine Arts
bell krater 95.26
Chiusi, Museo Archeologico Nazionale
bowl 1845
Compiègne, Musee Vivenel
bowl 1090 • bowl 1104
Ferrara, Museo Nazionale di Spina
skyphos T 441
Florence, Museo Archeologico Etrusco
fragment of a bowl 11 B 10 • fragment of a bowl 17 B 7 • fragment of a bowl 20 B 11 • fragment of a bowl PD 28 • fragment of a bowl PD 172 • fragment of a bowl PD 289 • fragment of a bowl PD 563
Freiburg, Albert-Ludwigs-Universität
Fragment of a bowl
London, British Museum
hydria E 226
formerly Munich, private collection Paul Arndt
bowls
formerly New Haven, Clairmont
pyxis
New York City, Metropolitan Museum
pyxis 39.11.8
Padula, Salerno, Museo Archeologico della Lucania Occidentale nella Certosa di Padula
Fragment of a bowl stand
Paris, Musée National du Louvre
bowl CP 10952 • fragment of a bowl CP 11605 • fragment of a bowl CP 11606 • fragment of a bowl CP 11607 • fragment of a bowl CP 11608 • fragment of a bowl CP 11609 • fragment of a bowl CP 11610 • fragment of a bowl CP 11611 • bowl G 269 • bowl G 630 • pyxis L 55
Prague, Charles University
lekythos 22.62
Reggio Calabria, Museo Nazionale
2 fragments of bowls • fragment of a skyphos
Thessaloniki, Archaeological Museum
fragment of a kantharos 34.157
Vienna, Kunsthistorisches Museum
bell krater 1771 • bowl 2150
Winchester, College Museum
bowl 71

Bibliography 

 John Beazley: Attic Red-figure Vase-painters, 2nd ed. Oxford 1963, p. 922-924.

Ancient Greek vase painters
Anonymous artists of antiquity
5th-century BC Athenians